Juliane Wetzel (born 1957 in Munich) is a German historian.

Wetzel is a senior researcher at the  Centre for Research on Antisemitism, Technical University Berlin.

Wetzel co-authored a March 2003 report on anti-Semitism in the European Union with  Werner Bergmann in which they  identified anti-globalization rallies as one of the sources of anti-Semitism on the left.

Books

  Antisemitismus und radikaler Islamismus with Wolfgang Benz, Essen : Klartext, 2007.
  Jüdisches Leben in München, 1945-1951 : Durchgangsstation oder Wiederaufbau?  München : Kommissionsverlag Uni-Druck, 1987.
  (together with Angelika Königseder), Lebensmut im Wartesaal. Die jüdischen DPs (Displaced Persons) im Nachkriegsdeutschland, Fischer Taschenbuch Verlag: Frankfurt am Main 1994,  (reprint 2004).
  (together with Angelika Königseder), Waiting for Hope. Jewish Displaced Persons in Post-World War II Germany, Evanston /Ill. 2001 (Northwestern University Press).

References

20th-century German historians
Living people
1957 births